The Texas–Tyler Patriots are the athletic teams that represent the University of Texas at Tyler, located in Tyler, Texas, in NCAA Division II intercollegiate sports.

The Patriots are full members of the Lone Star Conference, which is home to all sixteen athletic programs.

History
As of July 2017, the school was considering a move to Division II as a part of a strategy to be a more significant player in the region, possibly building a new athletic campus in the process.

On February 2, 2018, the school formally applied for Division II status; if approved, full membership would begin on September 1, 2021. No conference affiliation was initially announced. After the NCAA approved UT Tyler to begin the transition process, UT Tyler would be announced as a new member of the Lone Star Conference effective with the 2019–20 school year.

National championships

Team

Varsity teams

List of teams

Men's sports (7)
 Baseball
 Basketball
 Cross Country
 Golf
 Soccer
 Tennis
 Track and field

Women's sports (9)
 Basketball
 Cross country
 Golf
 Lacrosse
 Soccer
 Softball
 Tennis
 Track and field
 Volleyball

References

External links
 

University of Texas at Tyler
College sports teams in Texas
College sports teams in the United States by team
NCAA Division II teams